This list of museums in Indiana is a list of museums, defined for this context as institutions (including nonprofit organizations, government entities, and private businesses) that collect and care for objects of cultural, artistic, scientific, or historical interest and make their collections or related exhibits available for public viewing. Museums that exist only in cyberspace (i.e., virtual museums) are not included. Also included are non-profit and university art galleries.

Museums

Defunct museums
 Carter's Toy Museum, Zionsville, closed in 2012
 "Collectible Classics" Car Museum, Hagerstown, closed notice
 College Football Hall of Fame, South Bend, closed in 2012, reopened in Atlanta, Georgia in 2014
 Corvette Classics Museum, Fort Wayne 
 Forest Discovery Center, Starlight, closed in 2009 
 Indiana Aviation Museum, Valparaiso, closed in 2010
 Indiana Historic Radio Museum, Ligonier, closed in 2008
 The Lincoln Museum, Fort Wayne, closed June 30, 2008.
 Morris-Butler House, no longer open for tours
 Ragtops Museum, Michigan City, closed in 2011
 Trumps' Texaco Museum, Knightstown, featured Texaco memorabilia,
 Hostetler's Hudson Museum, Shipshewana, closed in 2018.

See also
Arboreta in Indiana (category)
Botanical gardens in Indiana (category)
List of nature centers in Indiana
Observatories in Indiana (category)

Resources
Association of Indiana Museums
Visit Indiana
Historical Museum Guide for Indiana
Historic House Museums in Indiana

References

Indiana

Museums
Museums